Harold William Taylor Wager FRS (11 March 1862 – 17 November 1929) was a British botanist and mycologist. He was the uncle of the geologist Lawrence Rickard Wager. He was made a Fellow of the Royal Society in 1904. He was President of the British Mycological Society in 1910 and again in 1919.

Wager was first a lecturer in botany at the Yorkshire College, then at Victoria University, then later he took the role of an Inspector of Schools for the Board of Education.

References

External links

1862 births
1929 deaths
Fellows of the Royal Society
British botanists
British mycologists